Mathew Hubert Murray (born June 4, 1993), credited professionally as M. H. Murray, is a Canadian writer and filmmaker. He began his career writing, directing, and editing short films, before attracting recognition for his work on the web series Teenagers (2014–2017), which won several accolades.

Early life
Murray was born in Mississauga to a French Canadian mother and a Scottish Canadian father. He was raised in the Port Credit area of Mississauga. In high school, he started a YouTube channel and began creating "little slasher films" with his family and friends. He later graduated from York University's film school.

Career 
Murray began his career writing, directing, and editing short films. In 2013, when he was 19 years old, Murray started developing the concept for what would become his first web series, Teenagers. Upon release in early 2014, Teenagers attracted media attention because its cast included former Degrassi stars Chloe Rose and Raymond Ablack. Playback wrote that "the young creators of Teenagers had to have plenty of luck, pluck, talent, and grit to get this far. And that portends a Hollywood ending". Murray co-produced the first season alongside Emmanuel Kabongo, who also starred in all three seasons of the series.

The first episode of the second season premiered online in July 2015 and subsequently went viral; it has since been viewed over 3 million times on YouTube. The second season was nominated for various awards, including a Canadian Screen Award and four Indie Series Awards. A third and final season, which consists of four episodes, was released in late 2017 and received six nominations from the International Academy of Web Television and three nominations at the 9th annual Indie Series Awards. T. J. Scott served as executive producer of the second and third seasons.

Since its release, Teenagers has received positive reviews from critics. Now called the series "sexy" and "provocative", concluding that "because it’s not held hostage by the same rules as big network television shows, it pushes the boundaries".

Following the conclusion of Teenagers, Murray shot another short film, titled Ghost, in December 2018. The film stars Mark Clennon as Benjamin, a gay man who is "ghosted" by his lover. In October 2020, Ghost premiered at the 30th annual Inside Out Film and Video Festival. Ghost subsequently had its U.S. premiere at the 47th annual Seattle International Film Festival in April 2021. It also screened at film festivals in Paris and Connecticut. In June 2021, Murray released Ghost online. The following year, Murray co-directed the music video for Clennon's song "Kingston", which was filmed in Kingston, Jamaica, becoming the first music video shot in Jamaica to feature an on-screen romance between two men.

Influences 
Murray's work on Teenagers has drawn comparisons to the Degrassi franchise. In a December 2016 interview with CBC's q radio show, Murray refuted Degrassi comparisons, saying that while he "respects" the show, he believes that Teenagers is "a fresh take on that experience". Murray has stated that he was influenced by Issa Rae's The Misadventures of Awkward Black Girl, John Hughes's The Breakfast Club, and Larry Clark's Kids.

Murray has also said that he is influenced by American actor and filmmaker John Cassavetes and "people who use their own resources and money to get their projects going when studios or other people ignore them."

Personal life 
Murray has spoken publicly about being part of the LGBT community.

Accolades
For his work on Teenagers, Murray has won several accolades. At the Vancouver Web Series Festival, Murray won awards for Best Screenplay in 2016 and Best Canadian Series in 2018. In 2017, he was nominated for Best Director at the 5th annual International Academy of Web Television Awards.

References

Notes

External links 

 

1993 births
Living people
Canadian LGBT screenwriters
Writers from Toronto
Web series directors
21st-century Canadian screenwriters
21st-century Canadian male writers
Canadian male screenwriters
Canadian gay writers
Gay screenwriters
21st-century Canadian LGBT people